Kimmo Savolainen (born 2 August 1974) is a Finnish former ski jumper.

World Cup

Standings

Wins

External links

1974 births
Living people
People from Siilinjärvi
Finnish male ski jumpers
Sportspeople from North Savo